RW Aurigae is a young binary system in the constellation of Auriga about  away, belonging to the Taurus-Auriga association of the 
Taurus Molecular Cloud. RW Aurigae B was discovered in 1944.

System 
These are loosely bound, and their orbital trajectory is nearly parabolic, with an orbital period of 1000−1500 years as evidenced by the structure of the ejected dust jets. The star system's orbit is retrograde compared to the rotation direction of the disk orbiting the primary star. RW Aurigae A is also suspected to be a close binary since 1999.

Properties 
Both members of the binary are medium-mass objects still contracting towards the main sequence and accreting mass, RW Aurigae A at the rate of 0.1/Myr, and RW Aurigae B at the rate of 0.005/Myr. Their ages are equal to 3 million years.

The binary is surrounded by a complex accretion structure, containing a circumbinary shell, spiral arms, bow shocks and protoplanetary disks. RW Aur A is producing complex bipolar jets extending as far as 46 thousand AU from the star. Its protoplanetary disk is inclined to the line of sight by 45-60 degrees. It is not known if planetary formation in the disk has been arrested by stellar encounter or accelerated, as a wide range of debris sizes, consistent with both a collision cascade and ongoing planetesimal formation were detected. However, new work published in the 2018 - 2022 time period has shown strong evidence for the stochastic destruction of a large asteroid (approx. Vesta sized) differentiated planetesimal's Fe (iron) core at the inner edge of RW Aur A's accretion disk and the funneling of this material into the protostar's atmosphere and outflow jets. This implies both the creation of large asteroid-like bodies in far-out, cooler regions of the accretion disk and their migration into its innermost regions where they undergo catastrophic high energy collisions.

Variability 
RW Aurigae A varies in brightness. It is a T Tauri variable, and a prototype for the eponymous class of RW Aurigae variables, exhibiting irregular dips in its light curve due to the rapidly changing geometry of the protoplanetary disk, disturbed by the periastron passage of RW Aurigae B.  A previous periastron passage happened about 400 years ago. The long-lasting brightness dips in 2010-2011 and 2014-2016 reduced the star's brightness to magnitude 12.5, before recovering to visual magnitude 10.5-11.0 by August 2016.

The companion star is itself a variable of UX Orionis type, exhibiting both chaotic variations of brightness and short (less than one day) brightness dips due to continuing accretion and the inhomogeneity of the protoplanetary disk.

See also
FU Tauri

References 

Binary stars
T Tauri stars
Circumstellar disks
Auriga (constellation)
240764
BD+30 792
023873
J05074953+3024050
Auriga, RW